Gaza Strip Premier League is one of the two top divisions organized by the Palestinian Football Association. The other is the West Bank Premier League.

It has been disputed since 1984, even if the considerable problems linked to the Israeli-Palestinian conflict have prevented its development or forced the interruption of various editions. Only seven championships have certainly been completed, due to scarce information on past editions of this tournament.

The 5,000-capacity Rafah Municipal Stadium is the main venue for the league.

Champions
Champions so far are:

1984–85: Al-Ahli Gaza
1985–86: Khadamat Al-Shatea
1986–87: Khadamat Al-Shatea
1987–95: Not known
1995–96: Khadamat Rafah SC
1996-97: Not known
1997–98: Khadamat Rafah SC
1998–05: Not known
2005–06: Khadamat Rafah SC
2007–10: Not known
2010–11: Shabab Khan Yunes SC
2011–12: Not known
2012–13: Shabab Rafah
2013–14: Shabab Rafah
2014–15: Al-Ittihad Shuja'iyya 
2015–16: Khadamat Rafah SC 
2016–17: Al-Sadaqah 
2017–18: Shabab Khan Yunes SC 
2018–19: Khadamat Rafah SC 
2019–20: Khadamat Rafah SC 
 2020–21: Shabab Rafah
 2021-22: Shabab Rafah

2020-21 champions

References

External links
League on goalzz.com

 
1
Top level football leagues in Asia
Sport in the Gaza Strip
Sports leagues established in 1984
1984 establishments in the Palestinian territories